Friedrich August von Kaulbach (2 June 1850 in Munich – 26 July 1920 in Ohlstadt, Germany) was a German portraitist and historical painter.

Biography
He was born to a family that included several well known artists and began his studies with his father, Friedrich Kaulbach. He then attended the Academy of Fine Arts, Nuremberg, where he studied with August von Kreling and Karl Raupp. He transferred to the Academy of Fine Arts, Munich, in 1871 and worked with Wilhelm von Diez. In 1883, he became a teacher there himself.

Along with Franz von Lenbach and Franz von Stuck, he was known as one of the "Malerfürsten" (painter princes) and was one of the highest paid portrait painters in Germany. His works were commissioned by the uppermost social circles there and in America. His painting, "Children's Carnival" (the five children of mathematician Alfred Pringsheim), shows Katia Pringsheim (far left), who would later marry the writer, Thomas Mann. Several stays in Paris followed. In 1886, he was appointed Director of the Munich Academy and was ennobled. He was also a member of the Prussian Academy of Art in Berlin.

In 1897, he married Frida Scotta, a famous Danish violist. His daughter Hedda married the sculptor, and his daughter , who was a singer, married the painter Max Beckmann.

His half-sister, was a novelist.

In 1893, he built the Kaulbach-Villa in Ohlstadt, which served as a second summer residence. Since 1997, it has been a museum, showing thirty of his paintings and a number of drawings. His studio is maintained in its original state.

Selected paintings

See also
 List of German painters

References

Further reading
 Georg Habich, "Friedrich August von Kaulbach", in: Die Kunst für alle: Malerei, Plastik, Graphik, Architektur, Vol.15, F. Bruckmann, 1900 (Die Kunst für alle: Malerei, Plastik, Graphik, Architektur (15.1899/1900), Die Kunst für alle: Malerei, Plastik, Graphik, Architektur (15.1899/1900) Online)
 Evelyn Lehmann, Elke Riemer: Die Kaulbachs. Eine Künstlerfamilie aus Arolsen, Waldeckischer Geschichtsverein, Arolsen 1978.
 Brigitte Salmen (Hrsg.): „Ich kann wirklich ganz gut malen“. Friedrich August von Kaulbach – Max Beckmann, Murnau, 2002 
 
 Klaus Zimmermann, Friedrich August von Kaulbach: 1850–1920 ; Monographie und Werkverzeichnis, Materialien zur Kunst des 19. Jahrhunderts, Vol.26, Prestel, 1980

External links

 More works by Kaulbach @ ArtNet
 
 Kaulbachs Germania Deutsches Historisches Museum, Berlin – Inv.-Nr.: 1988/82

1850 births
1920 deaths
19th-century German painters
19th-century German male artists
German male painters
20th-century German painters
20th-century German male artists
Academy of Fine Arts, Nuremberg alumni
German untitled nobility
Von Kaulbach family